Meydan-e Khodaverdi (also Romanized as Meydān-e Khodāverdī) is a village in Qilab Rural District, Alvar-e Garmsiri District, Andimeshk County, Khuzestan Province, Iran. At the 2006 census, its population was 49, in 9 families.

References 

Populated places in Andimeshk County